The Philippines has been governed by legislatures since 1898. The country has had different setups, with legislatures under the presidential system and the parliamentary system, and with legislatures having one or two chambers.

The first national legislature in the Philippines was the Malolos Congress that convened in the Barasoain Church at Malolos, Bulacan. Convened after the declaration of independence from Spain at the height of the Philippine Revolution, the Congress ratified the declaration, and drafted a constitution. With the capture of President Emilio Aguinaldo during the ensuing Philippine–American War, the unrecognized First Philippine Republic fell.

The Americans then sent several commissions to assess the situation; these eventually became the Philippine Commission. With the passage of the Philippine Bill of 1902, the Philippine Commission eventually became an appointive upper house of the new Philippine Legislature, of which the wholly elected Philippine Assembly was the lower house. The passage of the Philippine Autonomy Act instituted a mostly elective Senate as the upper house, with the House of Representatives as the lower house. This set up continued until the 1935 Constitution of the Philippines was set into force, creating a unicameral National Assembly under the Commonwealth of the Philippines. Amendments that took effect in 1941 restored the bicameral setup, creating the Commonwealth Congress. However, World War II intervened, and legislators elected in 1941 were not be able to serve. The invading Japanese set up the Second Philippine Republic that convened its own National Assembly.

The Allies reconquered the Philippines and the legislators elected in 1941 who are either still alive or are not arrested for collaboration convened in 1945. The Americans granted independence on July 4, 1946, and the Commonwealth Congress was renamed as Congress of the Republic of the Philippines. This will continue until the declaration of martial law by President Ferdinand Marcos on September 23, 1972, which effectively dissolved Congress. Marcos then exercised legislative power; his 1973 Constitution created the unicameral Batasang Pambansa, a parliament. The Batasang Pambansa first convened in 1978, and will continue to exist until the 1986 People Power Revolution that overthrew Marcos from power. President Corazon Aquino appointed a constitutional commission that drafted the 1987 Constitution which restored the bicameral Congress with the presidential system of government.

List

Per legislative term

Per party 
These are at the start of every legislature. A politician may switch parties mid-term. Appointed members appear after the plus sign (+).

Senate

House of Representatives

Party-list elections 
This includes all parties that have won at least 2 seats in any election.

Graphical timeline 

Legend

Senate 
 Gaps refer to instances when the legislature was unicameral.

House of Representatives 

 Gaps from 1946 to 1971 refer to instances when there was no lower house election for it was a midterm election (senators have 6-year terms with staggered elections every two years, while representatives have 4-year terms). Starting in 1995, a midterm election includes both upper and lower house elections (senators have 6-year terms with staggered elections every three years, while representatives have 3-year terms).

Chronological timeline

See also 
Congress of the Philippines
Senate of the Philippines
House of Representatives of the Philippines

Notes

References

Further reading 

 

 
Philippines